Cabela's Ultimate Deer Hunt 2 is the first sequel to Cabela's Ultimate Deer Hunt. It was developed by Sylum Entertainment, Ltd. and released September, 2002.

The game was published by Activision, in conjunction with hunting supply company Cabela's.

External links

2002 video games
Windows games
Windows-only games
Activision games
Cabela's video games
Hunting video games
Video games developed in the United States